The 2002 New Mexico State Aggies football team represented New Mexico State University in the 2002 NCAA Division I-A football season. The Aggies were coached by head coach Tony Samuel and played their home games at Aggie Memorial Stadium in Las Cruces, New Mexico. They participated as members of the Sun Belt Conference. Their 7 wins were the most wins for New Mexico State since 1970. Until the 2017 season, this was the last Aggies team to finish with a winning record. Despite finishing 7-5, they were not invited to a bowl game.

Schedule

Roster

|special_teams_players=

}}

References

New Mexico State
New Mexico State Aggies football seasons
New Mexico State Aggies football